Hughson may refer to:

Hughson (surname)
Hughson, California, city in California, United States .... Hughson, CA was founded by descendants of the Hughson family of Albany, NY.  There is extensive research of this family on the Internet.  Nicholas Hughson was the forefather of this family which settled.  There is something in the family history that ties them to being the first Ford Dealership in CA.

See also
Hughson Mansion, historic home in Albany County, New York, United States